Glenn D. Devine (October 22, 1895 – July 1, 1970) was an American college football player and coach. A graduate of Des Moines West High School, Devine coached at Parsons College from 1922 to 1931. He was the brother of star football player Aubrey Devine. Devine died on July 1, 1970, at a hospital in Iowa City, Iowa.

References

External links
 

1895 births
1970 deaths
American football halfbacks
Iowa Hawkeyes football players
Parsons Wildcats football coaches
Players of American football from Des Moines, Iowa